Katrina Colleton (born March 17, 1971) is an American former professional basketball player who played for the Los Angeles Sparks and Miami Sol.

References

External links
Katrina Colleton WNBA Stats | Basketball-Reference.com
WNBA.com: Katrina Colleton Player Info

1971 births
Living people
American women's basketball players
Basketball players from Tampa, Florida
Guards (basketball)
Forwards (basketball)
Los Angeles Sparks draft picks
Los Angeles Sparks players
Miami Sol players
21st-century American women